Michael Paul Tait (born 30 September 1956) is an English former footballer and later a manager at the end of his playing career. His 760 league games puts him 13th in the list of English footballers. His clubs were Oxford United, Carlisle United, Hull City, Portsmouth, Reading, Darlington and Hartlepool United as well as Gretna in Scotland. Tait also later managed two of these clubs; Darlington and Hartlepool United. In 2012 he became a scout for Newcastle United.

Playing career
Tait started his career as an apprentice at Oxford scoring 23 goals in 64 league appearances before moving on to Carlisle for £65,000 in 1977. He scored 20 goals for Carlisle in 106 league appearances before moving on to Hull City £150,000 in 1979. Tait scored 3 goals in 33 league appearances whilst at Boothferry Park before moving on to Portsmouth for £100,000 in 1980. At Portsmouth he scored 30 goals in 240 league appearances. In 1987, he moved to Reading for £50,000 scoring 10 goals in 99 league appearances before moving on to Darlington in 1990 for free. At Darlington he scored 2 goals in 79 league appearances. In the 1992 close season he joined Hartlepool United, scoring 1 goal in 61 league appearances. In the 1994 close season he joined Gretna, but within weeks he was re-signed by Hartlepool and remained registered as a player with them until 1998, by which time he had been playing in the Football League for 24 years.

Coaching career
In 1998, two years into his second spell at Victoria Park, Tait retired as a player and took over as player manager for the team until he was released in 1999. Tait then took over as manager for Northern Premier League Premier Division team Blyth Spartans, but left the Croft Park club at the end of the season. Two years later Tait was back in the Football League but this time at Darlington, taking over as caretaker manager in 2002. In June 2003 he was offered the job on a permanent basis, but was released by Darlington four months later in October 2003 until the club brought him back as reserve team coach. In February 2008 it was confirmed by Darlington that Tait had left the club. In 2009 Tait had a brief spell as coach at then Northern Premier League First Division club Newcastle Blue Star before taking over as manager at Conference North club Blyth Spartans in May of the same year. After the 2010–11 season his contract expired and was not renewed.

Honours

As a player
Portsmouth
Third Division Title winner: 1982–83
Second Division Title winner: 1986–87

Reading
Full Members Cup winner: 1988

Darlington
Fourth Division Title winner: 1990–91

Managerial statistics

References

External links

1956 births
Living people
English footballers
English Football League players
Oxford United F.C. players
Carlisle United F.C. players
Hull City A.F.C. players
Portsmouth F.C. players
Reading F.C. players
Darlington F.C. players
Hartlepool United F.C. players
Gretna F.C. players
English football managers
Hartlepool United F.C. managers
Darlington F.C. managers
Wallsend Boys Club players
Association football midfielders
Association football defenders
Hartlepool United F.C. non-playing staff